The Jack Artist is the second studio album by American rapper The Jacka. It was released on March 15, 2005, through The Artist Records. Recording sessions took place at The Grill Studios in Emeryville. All songs were produced by Maki & RobLo of Blahk Operah Muzik with the exception of "Girls Say", which was produced by Sync Knock. The whole album was executive produced and written by The Jacka. 
     
Guest features include Dubb 20, J Stalin, RobLo, Fed-X, Cormega, Rydah J. Klyde, Keak Da Sneak, Yukmouth, AP.9, Husalah, Ampachino, Shania D., TrueQ, Akata, and Lil' Ric. The album sold around a total of 200,000 units but was failed to chart.

The tracks "Barney (More Crime) and "Never Blink" were both released as singles in 2004, and both had videos filmed for them.

Track listing 

Never Blink  (feat. J. Stalin & Dubb 20)
Iller Clip
Get Out There (feat. Roblo)
Standing By Starz (feat. Fed-X)
Barney (More Crime) [Remix] (feat. Cormega & Rydah J. Klyde)
Girls Say
Lookin' At It (feat. Keak Da Sneak & Yukmouth)
Sometimes I (feat. Mob Figaz)
Never Equal (feat. Ampichino)
Feel This Clip
Really Dope (feat. Dubb 20 & Husalah)
Delicate Lifestyle (feat. Trueq & Husalah)
Turned Out (Action) (feat. Akata)
Blind World (feat. Husalah)
Drugged Out (feat. Fed-X)
Hey Girl [Remix] (feat. Husalah)
Won't Break Me (feat. Lil' Ric)
Kuran
Barney (More Crime)

Sample credits 

(Note that these were provided through a third-party website as the original release has no credits)

"Barney (More Crime)" contains elements from "Winter Time" by Steve Miller Band

"Never Blink" contains elements from "Suddenly" by Billy Ocean

"Drugged Out" contains elements from "The Turn Of A Friendly Card (Pt. 2)" by The Alan Parsons Project

References

External links
Jack Artist at The Bay
[ Jack Artist] at AllMusic

2005 albums
The Jacka albums